The 1964 FFSA Trophées de France season was the inaugural season of the Trophées de France championship for Formula Two cars. After three rounds Jack Brabham and Denny Hulme were level on points. Brabham won the last round, the Grand Prix de l'ile de France, and took the title.

FFSA Trophées de France
Champion:  Jack Brabham

Runner Up:  Denny Hulme

Results

Table

References

Trophées de France seasons